The only season of The X Factor South Africa, aired on SABC 1 from September 6, 2014 until December 13, 2014. It won by trio Four who were mentored in the Groups category.

Due to poor finances from the company that aired it, a second season was not commissioned.

Selection process

Auditions
Audtionees, by choice, were given a card for them to sing on stage. The chosen songs were mainly, Lady Gaga, Little Mix, Destiny's Child etc. This discontinued from, Auditions Week 2. The age limit this year was 13 years old.

Auditions were held in Durban, Bloemfontein, Cape Town, Polokwane, Johannesburg, Nelspruit and Pietermaritzburg.

Six Chair Challenge
In this round, the Auditionees had to sing a song themed from the Song Jukebox for one week. The ongoing chosen theme was R&R. If the auditionees did not sing a R&R song, they would be kicked out of the contest, into the Danger Zone stage.

Danger Zone
This is the round, where if five different auditionees did not sing the selected theme for the Six Chair Challenge, they would end up here, and would have to sing a song chosen by the judges, and if they do good, they move to the next round, and someone who has already got a seat at the sixth chair challenge is going home. If they didn't, the auditionee, is going home themselves.

Home visits

Contestants
Key:
 – Winner
 – Runner-up
 – Third place

Live Shows
Like the Six Chair Challenge, the Song Jukebox, will be used to decide what genre of music the contestants will sing. If they fail to sing the selected genre, they will be going to Danger Zone, and will be asked to sing again, and will be given a song, the judges picked out. If they sing beautifully, they are through to the next stage of the Live Shows, and a contestant who has gotten through to the next round will leave, and if the contestant doesn't sing their heart out, their going home, themselves.

Before the presenter declared the winner, the Winner him or herself will appeared on the X Factor App.

Results summary

Colour key

 Mikhal Jones were brought into the live shows after week 1.

The X Factor
South African reality television series
South African television series based on British television series
2014 South African television seasons